The Americas Zone is one of the three zones of regional Davis Cup competition in 2009.

In the Americas Zone there are four different groups in which teams compete against each other to advance to the next group.

Format

There will be a Round Robin with eight teams. The eight nations will be divided into two pools of four. The top two teams in each pool will advance to the Final Pool of four teams from which the two highest-placed nations are promoted to Americas Group II in 2010. The bottom two teams of each pool of the Round Robin will compete against each other in the Relegation Pool. The two lowest-placed nations are relegated to Americas Group IV in 2010.

Information

Venue: La Libertad, El Salvador

Surface: Hard – outdoors

Dates: 22–26 April

Participating teams

 
 
 
 
 
 
 
  – withdrew

Pool A

Matches

El Salvador vs. Bolivia

Bolivia vs. Barbados

El Salvador vs. Barbados

Pool B

Cuba vs. Costa Rica

Honduras vs. Puerto Rico

Honduras vs. Costa Rica

Cuba vs. Puerto Rico

Puerto Rico vs. Costa Rica

Honduras vs. Cuba

Promotion Pool (1st to 4th Play-off)

 The matches El Salvador-Bolivia and Cuba-Puerto Rico will not be played as they already played against each other in the previous round. Furthermore, the points gained at the matches played in the previous round will count for the table.

Matches

El Salvador vs. Cuba

Puerto Rico vs. Bolivia

El Salvador vs. Puerto Rico

Cuba vs. Bolivia

Relegation Pool (5th to 7th Play-off)

 The match Costa Rica-Honduras will not be played as it has already been played in the previous round. Furthermore, the points gained at the match played in the previous round will count for the table.

Matches

Honduras vs. Barbados

Costa Rica vs. Barbados

External links
Davis Cup draw details

Group III